President Jones may refer to:

Anson Jones, president of the Republic of Texas
Bob Jones Sr. (1883–1968), president of Bob Jones University
Bob Jones Jr. (1911–1997), president of Bob Jones University
Rock F. Jones, president of Ohio Wesleyan University
Stephen Jones (administrator) (born 1969), president of Bob Jones University

See also
Rufus Jones for President, 1933 American Pre-Code satirical musical-comedy